The 2008 CCHA Men's Ice Hockey Tournament was the 37th CCHA Men's Ice Hockey Tournament. It was played between March 6 and March 22, 2008. Opening round and quarterfinal games were played at campus sites, while the semifinals, third place, and championship games were played at Joe Louis Arena in Detroit, Michigan. By winning the tournament, Michigan received the Central Collegiate Hockey Association's automatic bid to the 2008 NCAA Division I Men's Ice Hockey Tournament.

Conference standings
Note: GP = Games played; W = Wins; L = Losses; T = Ties; PTS = Points; GF = Goals For; GA = Goals Against

Bracket

Note: * denotes overtime period(s)

First round

(5) Ferris State vs. (12) Western Michigan

(6) Northern Michigan vs. (11) Ohio State

(7) Bowling Green vs. (10) Lake Superior State

(8) Nebraska-Omaha vs. (9) Alaska

Quarterfinals

(1) Michigan vs. (8) Nebraska-Omaha

(2) Miami vs. (7) Bowling Green

(3) Michigan State vs. (6) Northern Michigan

(4) Notre Dame vs. (5) Ferris State

Semifinals

(1) Michigan vs. (6) Northern Michigan

(2) Miami vs. (4) Notre Dame

Third place

(4) Notre Dame vs. (6) Northern Michigan

Championship

(1) Michigan vs. (2) Miami

Tournament awards

All-Tournament Team
F Matt Siddall (Northern Michigan)
F Tim Miller* (Michigan)
F Ryan Jones (Miami)
D Mark Mitera (Michigan)
D Alec Martinez (Miami)
G Jeff Zatkoff (Miami)
* Most Valuable Player(s)

References

External links
2008 CCHA Men's Ice Hockey Tournament

CCHA Men's Ice Hockey Tournament
Ccha tournament